Velpuru is a village that is part of suburban area of Tanuku Town in West Godavari district in the state of Andhra Pradesh in India. The postal code of Velpuru is 534222. The nearest airport is Rajahmundry.

Demographics 
The population of Velpuru as per 2011 census is about 22,768. The literacy rate is about 71%. The major sources of income and revenue for Velpur are agriculture and industrial factories nearby.

History 
Beginning in 1970, the initiatives taken up by Sri. Arimilli Venkata Ratnam, then village head has resulted medical, educational and recreational facilities in the village. Jainism flourished in Velpuru during the reign of Sada kings.

References

Citations

Sources 
 

Villages in West Godavari district